William Clyde Caldwell (May 14, 1843 – January 7, 1905) was an Ontario businessman and political figure. He represented Lanark North in the Legislative Assembly of Ontario as a Liberal member four times from 1872 to 1875, 1879 to 1886, 1888 to 1894 and 1898 to 1905.

He was born William Caldwell in Lanark in Canada West in 1843. He worked in his father's timber company and later became a partner in the business. He received a Bachelor of Arts from Queen's College in 1866. Around 1872, he adopted the middle name Clyde, after the Clyde River in Lanark County where the family held timber limits, to distinguish himself from several other William Caldwells in the province. On his father's death, he inherited the company and several mills in Lanark. He became part-owner of a grist mill in Carleton Place and built a sawmill in Almonte. He also owned a woollen mill in Lanark. He was elected in an 1872 by-election to represent Lanark North in the Ontario legislature. In 1883, he moved to Kingston but kept property in Lanark. Caldwell was also a member of the Freemasons. He died in Lanark in 1905. Caldwell Street in Lanark is named after him.

External links
Biography at the Dictionary of Canadian Biography Online

1843 births
1905 deaths
Businesspeople from Ontario
Canadian people of Scottish descent
Ontario Liberal Party MPPs
People from Lanark County